Rodrigo de Paula Pessoa (born 29 November 1972 in Paris, France), known as Rodrigo Pessoa, is a Brazilian equestrian and show jumper. An Olympic gold-medalist in individual jumping, he is an accomplished rider backed with over 70 Grand Prix wins. He has represented Brazil at seven Olympic Games. In 2017, Horse Sport Ireland announced Pessoa as the new Irish showjumping team manager. As chief for Team Ireland, they won the 2017 European title in Gothenburg, and in 2019 got Ireland qualified for the 2020 Tokyo Olympics by winning the FEI Nation's Cup final. At the end of 2019, he ended his cooperation with Horse Sport Ireland to dedicate time to his family and riding career. He rides for James H. Clark and Artemis Farms in Wellington and Greenwich.

Riding career 
Pessoa first competed in 1981 at Hickstead. In 1984, he claimed his first title as champion of the pony class, again in 1985. In 1988, he competed in his first Grand Prix.

He continued to build up his triumphant career by competing and winning many Grands Prix. In 1992, he rode Special Envoy in the Olympic Games in Barcelona for Brazil, making him one of the youngest riders to compete in the Olympics at the age of 19. In 1996, he again rode in the Olympics in Atlanta and helped Brazil win the bronze medal with Loro Piana TomBoy.

In 1998, he rode Gandini Lianos to be the youngest World Champion at 1998 FEI World Equestrian Games in Rome.

Pessoa took his career further by winning the World Cup Final on Baloubet du Rouet for three consecutive years in 1998, 1999, and 2000. He finished as the reserve champion in the fourth year. In his fifth and final World Cup, Rodrigo and Baloubet du Rouet finished in third place. He later claimed the title and prize for the world's best rider and in addition to the Show Jumping Year trophy. In 2000, he again won the bronze team medal at the Olympic Games in Sydney. In the 2004 Olympics in Athens, he won the individual silver medal, but after the disqualification of the Irish rider Cian O'Connor and his horse Waterford Crystal for doping, he was awarded the gold medal in an award ceremony in his home town of Rio de Janeiro. In 2010, he won the Grand Prix on a horse named HH Ashley.

In 2007, Pessoa won the individual silver and team gold medals at the Pan American Games, held in his hometown.

Pessoa attracted controversy in 2008 when he was suspended by the FEI after his horse Rufus failed a doping test at the 2008 Olympic games. Pessoa was fined 2,000 Swiss francs and was suspended from international competitions for four and a half months.

In 2010, he finished fourth individually and fourth with his team of Brazil at the World Equestrian Games in Lexington, KY.
In 2011, he again mounted the podium at the Pan American Games in Guadalajara, Mexico, with Team Brazil to collect a Team Silver Medal on HH Ashley.

He was also chosen to be Brazil's flag bearer at the 2012 Summer Olympics in London.

International Championship results

Horses 
Tinkabell-2006 Grey, Mare KWPN
HH Ashley – 2000, Chestnut, Mare, Hanoverian
HH Rebozo – 2000, Bay, Stallion, Mexican Sport Horse
HH Palouchin de Ligny – 2000, Chestnut, Gelding, (SF)
HH Let's Fly – 1999, Bay, Gelding, Hanoverian
HH Rufus – 1998, Bay, Gelding, (KWPN)
HH Oasis – Bay, Gelding, (SF). Died in 2007
Baloubet du Rouet – 1989, Chestnut, Stallion, (SF)
Loro Piana TomBoy – 1985, Bay, Gelding, (ISH)
Special Envoy – 1980, Chestnut, Gelding, (ISH)
Gandini Lianos – 1987, Bay, Gelding, (Holst)
Stardust – 1991, Bay, Mare, (ISH)

References

External links 
Rodrigo Pessoa website

1972 births
Living people
Brazilian male equestrians
Brazilian sportspeople in doping cases
Brazilian people of French descent
Brazilian show jumping riders
Olympic equestrians of Brazil
Equestrians at the 1992 Summer Olympics
Equestrians at the 1996 Summer Olympics
Equestrians at the 2000 Summer Olympics
Equestrians at the 2004 Summer Olympics
Equestrians at the 2007 Pan American Games
Equestrians at the 2008 Summer Olympics
Equestrians at the 2011 Pan American Games
Equestrians at the 2012 Summer Olympics
Olympic gold medalists for Brazil
Olympic bronze medalists for Brazil
Sportspeople from Paris
Olympic medalists in equestrian
Medalists at the 2004 Summer Olympics
Pan American Games gold medalists for Brazil
Pan American Games silver medalists for Brazil
Medalists at the 2000 Summer Olympics
Medalists at the 1996 Summer Olympics
Pan American Games medalists in equestrian
Medalists at the 2011 Pan American Games
Equestrians at the 2020 Summer Olympics
Doping cases in equestrian